Sizovo is a rural locality (a village) in Yukseyevskoye Rural Settlement, Kochyovsky District, Perm Krai, Russia. The population was 10 as of 2010.

Geography 
Sizovo is located 30 km north of Kochyovo (the district's administrative centre) by road. Moskvino is the nearest rural locality.

References 

Rural localities in Kochyovsky District